Kyvon Davenport (born August 28, 1996) is an American professional basketball player who last played for Orléans Loiret Basket of the LNB Pro A. He played college basketball for Georgia Highlands College and the University of Memphis before playing professionally in Israel.

High school career
Davenport grew up in Gainesville, Georgia. He attended East Hall High School in Hall County, Georgia, where he averaged 22 points, 12 rebounds and three blocked shots per game as a senior. Davenport led his team to the Class AAA state quarterfinals, while earning the AAA All-State First Team honors in 2014–15.

College career
Davenport started his college basketball career at Georgia Highlands College, where he was named a First Team Junior College All-American by the National Association of Basketball Coaches. Davenport averaged 16.5 points and 10.5 rebounds per game, while leading his team to a 32–2 overall record. On April 9, 2017, Davenport committed to the University of Memphis after receiving offers from ETSU, Ole Miss, Murray State and UTE.

Davenport played his final two years of college at Memphis under head coaches Tubby Smith and Penny Hardaway respectively. On December 15, 2018, Davenport recorded a college career-high 31 points, shooting 12-of-17 from the field, along with 11 rebounds in a 92–102 loss to Tennessee. Davenport led the Tigers in rebounding (6.9) and averaged 13.1 points per game in his senior year.

Professional career
On August 15, 2019, Davenport started his professional career with Hapoel Eilat of the Israeli Premier League, signing a one-year deal. On October 14, 2019, Davenport recorded 21 points in his second game with Eilat, he shot 6-of-11 from the field, along with eight rebounds and two blocks in an 86–102 loss to Maccabi Tel Aviv. He averaged 13.3 points and 6.8 rebounds per game. On June 25, 2020, Davenport signed with Cholet Basket of the LNB Pro A. He averaged 9.9 points and 4.1 rebounds per game in seven games. On January 11, 2021, Davenport signed with BC Budivelnyk of the Ukrainian league. He averaged 13.8 points, 3.3 rebounds, 1.2 assists and 1.0 steal per game. On September 23, 2021, Davenport signed with Orléans Loiret Basket of the LNB Pro A.

References

External links
 Memphis Tigers bio
 RealGM profile

1996 births
Living people
American expatriate basketball people in France
American expatriate basketball people in Israel
American expatriate basketball people in Ukraine
American men's basketball players
Basketball players from Georgia (U.S. state)
Cholet Basket players
Hapoel Eilat basketball players
Junior college men's basketball players in the United States
Memphis Tigers men's basketball players
Orléans Loiret Basket players
Power forwards (basketball)
People from Gainesville, Georgia
Sportspeople from the Atlanta metropolitan area